Huinca Renancó is a city in the province of Córdoba, Argentina.

Huinca Renanco is almost equidistant between Rio Cuarto, to the city's north, and Santa Rosa, to the city's south, via Argentina Highway 35.

Famous Residents 
Santos Laciar
Germán Sopeña

Populated places in Córdoba Province, Argentina
Populated places established in 1901